Chequered! is a studio album released by American singer Chubby Checker. Released by London Records in 1971, it is notable for being a stylistically different approach for Checker, opting for the more psychedelic sound that was popular at the time. It was produced by Ed Chalpin, who was known for giving Jimi Hendrix his first recording contract.

The album did not sell well in its initial release, but it was eventually reissued several times throughout various European markets under different names, such as New Revelation, The Other Side of Chubby Checker, or simply Chubby Checker. In 2012, the original album was reissued by Sunbeam Records.

Track listing
All songs written by Chubby Checker, except where noted.

References

1971 albums
London Records albums
Psychedelic music albums by American artists